Louis Joseph Lucier (March 23, 1918 – October 18, 2014) was an American Major League Baseball pitcher who played for the Boston Red Sox (1943–44) and Philadelphia Phillies (1944–45). He was born in Northbridge, Massachusetts. From 2012 until his death, Lucier was the oldest living former Red Sox player. 

Lucier is one of many ballplayers who only appeared in the major leagues during World War II. He made his major league debut on April 23, 1943, in relief against the Philadelphia Athletics at Shibe Park, giving up one run and one hit in two innings of work. His first major league start was the second game of a doubleheader against the Chicago White Sox at Comiskey Park on May 16, 1943 – he was the winning pitcher in a 4–2 complete game effort. Career totals include 33 games pitched, 9 starts, 3 complete games, a 3–5 record with 16 games finished, 1 save, 43 earned runs allowed in 101 innings, and an ERA of 3.81.  Lucier played excellent defense at his position, handling 45 of 46 total chances successfully for a fielding percentage of .978, which was above the league average at the time.

References

External links

1918 births
2014 deaths
Major League Baseball pitchers
Baseball players from Massachusetts
Boston Red Sox players
Philadelphia Phillies players
People from Northbridge, Massachusetts